Seminoe State Park is a public recreation area located on the northwest side of the Seminoe Reservoir, at the base of the Seminoe Mountains,  north of Sinclair, Carbon County, Wyoming. It is managed by the Wyoming Division of State Parks and Historic Sites.

History
Following construction of the Seminoe Dam and Reservoir in the 1930s, the state of Wyoming created the state park in 1965 through an agreement with the U.S. Bureau of Reclamation.

Activities and amenities
The park's recreational offerings include two camping areas, swimming, fishing, boating, and picnicking. Local wildlife includes bobcats, mule deer, skunks, raccoons, moose, elk, mountain lions, bighorn sheep, rabbits, and bald eagles.

References

External links
Seminoe State Park Wyoming State Parks, Historic Sites & Trails
Seminoe State Park Brochure Wyoming State Parks, Historic Sites & Trails

State parks of Wyoming
Protected areas of Carbon County, Wyoming
Protected areas established in 1965
1965 establishments in Wyoming